Mark Contreras (born January 24, 1995) is an American professional baseball outfielder in the Minnesota Twins organization. He made his MLB debut in 2022. Contreras played college baseball at the University of California, Riverside.

Early life and amateur career
Contreras grew up in Moreno Valley, California and attended Canyon Springs High School. He was a member of the varsity baseball team and won four consecutive Inland Valley League championships with the team.

Contreras attended the University of California, Riverside, and played college baseball for the UC Riverside Highlanders for four seasons. He was named second team All-Big West Conference after batting .332 with 14 doubles. As a senior Contreras led the team with a .366 batting average and a .427 on base percentage and was named first team All-Big West.

Professional career
The Minnesota Twins selected Contreras in the ninth round of the 2017 Major League Baseball draft. He was assigned to the Fort Myer Miracle at the beginning of the 2019 season and was promoted to the Double-A Pensacola Blue Wahoos and was named a minor league Gold Glove award winner at the end of the year. Contreras began the 2021 season with the Double-A Wichita Wind Surge, where he played 19 games before being promoted to the Triple-A St. Paul Saints.

The Twins promoted Contreras to their major league roster on May 10, 2022. He made his major league debut on May 11, entering the game as a defensive replacement for Byron Buxton after play resumed following a rain delay. Contreras played in 28 games for the Twins in 2022 and slashed .121/.148/.293 with three home runs and six RBIs.

On December 20, 2022, the Twins designated Contreras for assignment to make room on the 40-man roster for Joey Gallo.

References

External links

UC Riverside Highlanders bio

1995 births
Living people
People from Moreno Valley, California
Sportspeople from Riverside County, California
Baseball players from California
Major League Baseball outfielders
Minnesota Twins players
UC Riverside Highlanders baseball players
Elizabethton Twins players
Wichita Wind Surge players
St. Paul Saints players
Pensacola Blue Wahoos players
Fort Myers Miracle players
Cedar Rapids Kernels players
Criollos de Caguas players
Rochester Honkers players